Harpalus arcuatus is a species of ground beetle in the subfamily Harpalinae. It was described by Tschitscherine in 1898.

References

arcuatus
Beetles described in 1898